The Constitution of Nicaragua was reformed due to a negotiation of the executive and legislative branches in 1995. The reform of the 1987 Sandinista Constitution gave extensive new powers and independence to the National Assembly, including permitting the Assembly to override a presidential veto with a simple majority vote and eliminating the president's ability to pocket veto a bill. Both the president and the members of the unicameral National Assembly are elected to concurrent five-year terms.

History
The Nicaraguan Constitution promulgated on January 1, 1987 provided the final step in the institutionalization of the Sandinista regime and the framework under which the Chamorro government would take office. It was the ninth constitution in Nicaraguan history. The Sandinistas' revolutionary mythology and aspirations were glorified in the preamble, and the Nicaraguan Army was constitutionally named the Sandinista People's Army. Yet, even though drafted and approved by a Sandinista-dominated assembly, the constitution was not a revolutionary document.

It established a democratic system of government with a mixed economy based on a separation of powers that could guarantee civil liberties. There was some discontent with parts of the new system. Early objections were raised that the executive branch was too strong, that property rights were not adequately protected, and that some of the languages was vague and subject to widely differing interpretations. These objections continued to be an issue under the Chamorro government.

The Executive
The constitution provides for a strong executive branch, although the legislative and judicial branches retain significant powers of their own. Under the constitution, the president has broader powers than does the president of the United States. The president is commander in chief of the military, has the power to appoint all ministers and vice ministers of his or her cabinet, and proposes a national budget.

The executive shares legislative powers that allow him or her to enact executive decrees with the force of law in fiscal and administrative matters, as well as to promulgate regulations to implement the laws. The president assumes legislative powers when the National Assembly is in recess. The president has extraordinary powers during national emergencies, including the powers to suspend basic civil liberties and to prepare and approve the national budget.

The president's term was set at six years by a decree promulgated in January 1984, during the period when the country had no constitution. The 1987 Constitution reaffirmed a six-year term for the president.

The Legislature
The 1987 constitution replaced the bicameral Congress, which had existed under previous constitutions, with a unicameral National Assembly. The makeup of the National Assembly, first established under the 1984 decree and confirmed by the 1987 constitution, consists of ninety members directly elected by a system of proportional representation plus any unelected presidential or vice presidential candidates who receive a certain percentage of the vote. In 1985 the National Assembly had ninety-six members and in 1990, ninety-two. Terms are for six years, to run concurrently with the president's term.

The National Assembly has significant powers, and its cooperation is essential for the smooth functioning of the government. Under the constitution, representatives to the National Assembly propose legislation, which is made law by a simple majority of the representatives present if the National Assembly has a quorum. The National Assembly can override a presidential veto by quorum. The constitution also gives the National Assembly the power "to consider, discuss and approve" the budget presented by the president. The National Assembly chooses the seven members of the Supreme Court from lists provided by the president and has the authority to "officially interpret the laws", a prerogative that gives the National Assembly judicial powers.

The Judiciary
Under the 1987 constitution, the Supreme Court is an independent branch of government, whose members are selected for six-year terms by the National Assembly from lists submitted by the president. From among those members, the president selects the head of the Supreme Court. The constitution also provides that the Supreme Court justices appoint judges to the lower courts. Supreme Court justices can only be removed constitutionally "for reasons determined by law".

In National Assembly-approved 1990 reforms to the Organic Law of Tribunals, the Chamorro government enlarged the Supreme Court's membership from the constitutionally mandated seven justices to nine, as a way of breaking what was perceived as Sandinista domination of the court. Those seven members had been appointed to their six-year terms in December 1987, and their terms were to expire in 1993.

In 1990 President Chamorro also dismissed the court's Sandinista-appointed head and replaced him with one of her own choosing. The evaluation of this act depended on one's political point of view. According to Nicaraguan analysts, the nine-member court decided that it would take decisions only on the basis of consensus, a procedure some saw as guaranteeing Sandinista influence on the court, others saw as neutralizing Sandinista influence, and still others saw as effectively paralyzing the operations of the court.

See also
 Politics of Nicaragua
 Government of Nicaragua
Human Rights in Nicaragua

References

Footnotes

Works cited

Further reading
Las Constituciones de Nicaragua (English: The Constitutions of Nicaragua); Alvarez Lejarza (1958) Madrid: Ediciones Cultura Hispánica.

External links
Asamblea Nacional de Nicaragua 

Nicaragua
Law of Nicaragua